Winner(s) take(s) (it) all may refer to:

Competition, economics and politics

 Winner-takes-all voting
 Winner-take-all (computing)
 Winner-take-all market

Books

Fiction
 Winner Takes All (novel), a BBC Books Doctor Who novel
 "Winner Take All" (short story), a Sailor Steve Costigan story by Robert E. Howard

Nonfiction
 Winner-Take-All Politics, by Jacob S. Hacker and Paul Pierson
 The Winner-Take-All Society, by economist Robert Frank
  Winners Take All: The Elite Charade of Changing the World by Anand Giridharadas

Film
 Winner Takes All (1918 film), directed by Elmer Clifton
 Winner Take All (1924 film), directed by W. S. Van Dyke
 Winner Take All (1932 film), starring James Cagney
 Winner Take All (1939 film), starring Tony Martin
 Winner Take All, a 1975 made-for-TV film starring Shirley Jones and Laurence Luckinbill
 Winner Takes All (1982 film), directed by Wong Jing
 Winners Take All (film), a 1987 film directed by Fritz Kiersch
 Winner Takes All (2000 film), directed by Clifton Ko
 Winner Takes All (2004 film), short film directed by Helen M. Grace

Television
 Winner Takes All (game show), on the ITV network from 1975 to 1988, and on Challenge TV from 1997
 Winner Take All (game show), a 1940s and early '50s American game show
 "Winners Take All", the tenth episode of the fifth season of the sitcom Murphy Brown
 "Winner Take All", the ninth episode of the second season of Teen Titans

Music
 Winner Take All, 1998, by The Turbo A.C.'s
 Winner Takes All (album), 1979, by The Isley Brothers
 "The Winner Takes It All", 1980, by ABBA
 "Winner Takes It All" (Sammy Hagar song), 1987, from the film Over the Top
 Winners Take All (album) by Quiet Riot
 "Winners Take All", a song from the Quiet Riot album Condition Critical
 "Winners Take All", a song from the Aesop Rock EP Fast Cars, Danger, Fire and Knives

See also
 Kill the Winner hypothesis alternative to "Winner takes all" for population growth in microbes